Pleasant Valley Township is one of fourteen townships in Dodge County, Nebraska, United States. The population was 141 at the 2020 census. A 2021 estimate placed the township's population at 137. Like many rural areas, Pleasant Valley Township suffered greatly from the Great Depression. Most of the township's residents, at one time or another, have made their living from farming. Agriculture is still a significant component of the economy of Pleasant Valley Township.

Geography

Pleasant Valley Township is located in southwestern Dodge County along U.S. Route 20.

According to the United States Census Bureau, the township has a total area of 20.4 square miles (52.1 km2)

See also
County government in Nebraska

References

External links
City-Data.com

Townships in Dodge County, Nebraska
Townships in Nebraska